Uomini più uomini (Italian for Men More Men) is the eighth studio album by French singer Amanda Lear, released in 1989 by Ricordi International.

Background
On Uomini più uomini, Amanda worked only with Italian musicians. The album was recorded in Milan and mixed at Heaven Studio in Rimini, Italy. The lyrical content of the album talks mainly about love, and is written completely in Italian, making it Lear's first album to consist exclusively of non-English language material. The singer stated the album was recorded as a mean to appeal to Italian audience she had acquired as a TV presenter in Italy. The song "Una notte insieme a te" played during end credits in her 1989 Italian talk show Ars Amanda.

Uomini più uomini was only released in Italy where Lear's popularity remained high because of successful television career over the years. No singles were released, although the material received moderate promotion on TV. The album, however, failed to make much impact on charts. It would re-appear under the name Tant qu'il y aura des hommes in France the same year with half of the songs re-recorded in French, adding a new track, "Métamorphose".

The album was initially only available on vinyl and cassette. German company Siebenpunkts Verlags Gmbh has since acquired the publishing rights to the album and in 1993 it was re-released on CD by Farad Records as Indovina chi sono, with a different artwork and re-arranged track listing. Portions of the album would be subsequently re-released many times on different budget CD compilations, combined with tracks from its French language counterpart Tant qu'il y aura des hommes.

Track listing

Original edition
Side A
"Mia cara Clara" (Willy Molco, Vito Pallavicini, Paolo Conte) – 3:38
"Telegramma" (Cristiano Malgioglio, Corrado Castellari) – 3:12
"Ragazzino" (Daiano, Giulio Caliandro) – 4:18
"Ripassi domani" (Willy Molco, Vito Pallavicini, Paolo Conte) – 4:15
"Scuola d'amore" (Amanda Lear, Daiano) – 4:30

Side B
"Una notte insieme a te" (Sergio Menegale, Raffaele Ferrato) – 3:51
"Indovina chi sono" (Paolo Limiti, P. Leon) – 3:22
"Una rosa un tango" (Cristiano Malgioglio, Corrado Castellari) – 4:05
"Illibata" (Massimo Poggini, Daiano, Giulio Caliandro) – 3:25
"Due" (Carlo Zavaglia, Sabino Mogavero, Franco Graniero) – 3:27
"La partita di pallone" (Carlo Alberto Rossi, Edoardo Vianello) – 3:24

CD edition: Indovina chi sono
"La partita di pallone" (Carlo Alberto Rossi, Edoardo Vianello) – 3:22
"Una notte insieme a te" (Sergio Menegale, Raffaele Ferrato) – 3:51
"Illibata" (Massimo Poggini, Daiano, Giulio Caliandro) – 3:25
"Una rosa un tango" (Cristiano Malgioglio, Corrado Castellari) – 4:05
"Due" (Carlo Zavaglia, Sabino Mogavero, Franco Graniero) – 3:27
"Indovina chi sono" (Paolo Limiti, P. Leon) – 3:22
"Scuola d'amore" (Amanda Lear, Daiano) – 4:30
"Ragazzino" (Daiano, Giulio Caliandro) – 4:18
"Mia cara Clara" (Willy Molco, Vito Pallavicini, Paolo Conte) – 3:38
"Ripassi domani" (Willy Molco, Vito Pallavicini, Paolo Conte) – 4:15
"Telegramma" (Cristiano Malgioglio, Corrado Castellari) – 3:12

Personnel
Amanda Lear – lead vocals
Nicola Calgari – sound technician
Antonio Colombo – mastering
Moreno Ferrara – backing vocals, electric guitar
Mario Flores – sound engineer
Lalla Francia – backing vocals
Monica Magnani – backing vocals
Filippo Maniscalco – cover
Giorgio Mastrota – guest vocals on "Indovina chi sono"
Paolo Mauri – sound technician
Pier Carlo Penta – sound engineer
Stefano Previsti – record producer, musical arranger
Gennaro Trasi – acoustic guitar

Release history

References

External links
 Uomini più uomini at Discogs
 Uomini più uomini at Rate Your Music

1989 albums
Amanda Lear albums
Italian-language albums